Bhaad-gaaule or Bhad-gaole may refer to:
A resident of the place Bhadgaon in Nepal
A type of black cap/topi, especially made in the towns of Bhadgaon or Bhaktapur in Nepal, and a part of Newari traditional dress. This has been adopted as a part of Nepali national dress for men, as an alternative to the Palpali Dhaka topi.